Voronezh State Medical University named after N. N. Burdenko (former Voronezh State Medical Academy) is located in Voronezh, Russia.

Overview
In December 1930 the medical faculty of voronezh university became an independent medical institute consisting of two faculties the faculty of general medicine and the faculty of health. In 1933 the pediatric faculty, in 1957 the faculty of stomatology (dentistry) and 1983 the faculty of continuing education for medical specialists and practicing physicians were added. 

In 1992 the international faculty of medical education and the faculty of pre-university training were introduced. The Academy maintains contractual relationships with a great number of European higher educational institutions, such as the Medical Faculty of Humboldt University/Charite University Medicine of Berlin (Germany), Johannes Gutenberg University in Mainz Luther University of Halle- Wittenberg (Germany) Chukurova University, Adana (Turkey), etc.

The clinical base of the academy consists of 29 Affiliated hospitals and a network of polyclinics, where medical students gain exposure and practical skills. A

Recognition
The Academy is listed in the World Directory of Medical Schools, 9th Edition, published by the World Health Organization.

Dedication to International Students
In the year of foundation — 1994. International students are offered training in the following programs: «General Medicine», «Pediatrics», «Dentistry» and «Pharmacy». Foreign students are taught in English Language since 2002 onwards,

Degree Programs
Graduate courses
General Medicine
Pediatrics
Stomatology (Dentistry)
Nursing
Medico-prophylaxis
Pharmacy
Secondary medical and pharmaceutical education:
Nursing
Prosthetic dentistry
Pharmacy
Postgraduate courses
Internship
Residency
Ph.D. Course

References

Medical schools in Russia
Buildings and structures in Voronezh Oblast